Kamar Ab (also Romanized as Kamar Āb) is a village in Howmeh-ye Gharbi Rural District, in the Central District of Izeh County, Khuzestan Province, Iran. At the 2006 census, its population was 40, in 7 families.

References 

Populated places in Izeh County